The Eisner Award for Best U.S. Edition of International Material—Asia is an award for given to a comic book originally published in Asia and reprinted for sale in the United States of America. Comics by creators from Japan, South Korea, China, and Singapore have been nominated.

History and name change

Material from Asia was eligible for the Eisner award for Best U.S. Edition of Foreign Material from that award's inception in 1998 to 2006 (winning it in 1998, 1999, 2000, 2001, 2002, 2004, & 2005). In 2007 that award was split into Best U.S. Edition of International Material and Best U.S. Edition of International Material–Japan. Starting in 2010 the current name of Best U.S. Edition of International Material—Asia was adopted.

Winners and nominees

See also
 Eisner Award for Best U.S. Edition of International Material
 Eisner Award for Best Publication for Early Readers
 Eisner Award for Best Academic/Scholarly Work

Notes

References

Category
2007 establishments in the United States
Annual events in the United States
Awards established in 2007
U.S. Edition of International Material-Asia